The year 1822 in science and technology involved some significant events, listed below.

Biology
 "Rostocker Pfeilstorch", a white stork, is found in northern Germany with an arrow from central Africa through its neck, demonstrating the fact of bird migration.

Geology
 Georges Cuvier establishes new standards and methods in stratigraphy and paleontology.
 Gideon Mantell discovers the first fossil of the iguanodon.
 John Phillips and William Conybeare identify the Carboniferous Period.
 Jean Baptiste Julien d'Omalius d'Halloy identifies the Cretaceous Period. He also proposes the Jurassic System.

Mathematics
 July 3 – Charles Babbage publishes a proposal for a "difference engine", a mechanical forerunner of the modern computer for calculating logarithms and trigonometric functions. Construction of an operational version will proceed under British Government sponsorship 1823–32 but it will never be completed.
 Karl Feuerbach describes the nine-point circle of a triangle.
 William Farish of the University of Cambridge publishes a systematization of the rules for isometric drawing.

Medicine
 United States Army surgeon William Beaumont pioneers human gastric endoscopy on Alexis St. Martin.
 Scottish surgeon John Henry Wishart gives the first description in England of neurofibromatosis type II.

Physics
 Navier–Stokes equations in fluid dynamics first formulated.

Technology
 May 23 – HMS Comet launched at Deptford Dockyard in the United Kingdom, the first steamboat commissioned by the Royal Navy.
 June 10 – The Aaron Manby crosses the English Channel, making her the first seagoing iron steamboat.
 French civil engineer Louis Vicat completes construction of a concrete viaduct across the Dordogne at Souillac, Lot.

Events
 September 11 – Galileo's Dialogue Concerning the Two Chief World Systems (1632) is permitted by the Roman Catholic Church to be published.

Awards
 June 12 – Edward Banks knighted, the first such honour for work in civil engineering.
 Copley Medal: William Buckland

Births
 January 2 – Rudolf Clausius, German physicist (died 1888)
 January 6 – Heinrich Schliemann, German archaeologist (died 1890)
 January 12 – Étienne Lenoir, Belgian mechanical engineer (died 1900)
 February 16 – Sir Francis Galton, English explorer, biologist (died 1911)
 April 18 – August Heinrich Petermann, German cartographer (died 1878)
 June 10 – Lydia White Shattuck, American botanist (died 1889)
 July 22 – Gregor Mendel, Silesian geneticist (died 1884)
 October 13 (O.S. October 1) – Lev Tsenkovsky, Polish-Ukrainian biologist (died 1887)
 December 27 – Louis Pasteur, French biologist (died 1895)

Deaths
 January 21 – Marie-Aimée Lullin, Swiss entomologist (born 1751) 
 February 23 – Johann Matthäus Bechstein, German naturalist (born 1757)
 June 23 – René Just Haüy, French mineralogist (born 1743)
 August 13 – Jean-Robert Argand, Swiss-born mathematician (born 1768)
 August 25 – William Herschel, German-born British astronomer (born 1738)
 November 6 – Claude Louis Berthollet, French chemist (born 1748)

References

 
19th century in science
1820s in science